Liam Pádraic Aiken (born January 7, 1990) is an American actor. He has starred in films such as Stepmom (1998), Road to Perdition (2002), and Good Boy! (2003), and played Klaus Baudelaire in Lemony Snicket's A Series of Unfortunate Events (2004), based on the series of books. He also starred in the films Nor'easter (2012), Ned Rifle (2014), The Bloodhound (2020), and Bashira (2021).

Personal life
Aiken was born in New York City, the only child of Moya Aiken, an Irish-born artist; and Bill Aiken, an MTV producer, who is of Scots-Irish descent. Bill died of esophageal cancer in September 1992, at age 34, when Liam was two years old. Aiken grew up in New Jersey and attended Dwight-Englewood School, graduating in 2008. He then went on to major in film at New York University. , Aiken resides in Los Angeles.

Career
Aiken made his professional acting debut in a Ford Motor Company commercial by Ford Aerostar. He made his stage debut in the Broadway play A Doll's House at the age of seven, and his film debut in Henry Fool (1997). His first major film role came when he starred in Stepmom (1998). He appeared in Road to Perdition (2002) and the family film Good Boy! (2003). He was considered to play  Cole Sear in The Sixth Sense (1999), but the role went to Haley Joel Osment. The following year, he was also considered for the role of Harry Potter due to his Irish heritage and Scottish ancestry, as well as his previous work with director Chris Columbus on Stepmom, but Daniel Radcliffe ultimately won the role, due to J. K. Rowling's insistence that the part should go to a British actor.

Aiken went on to play intelligent 12-year-old orphan Klaus Baudelaire in Lemony Snicket's A Series of Unfortunate Events (2004). He also appeared in The Killer Inside Me (2010). In September 2011, he appeared in the CBS series A Gifted Man. From 2012 to 2015, he narrated the audiobook versions of All the Wrong Questions, a prequel series to A Series of Unfortunate Events.

In 2012, he portrayed a boy who returns home after being missing for years in Nor'easter, directed by Andrew Brotzman. In 2014, he played the title role in Ned Rifle, the third film in a trilogy that began with Henry Fool and continued with Fay Grim (2006). In 2020, he co-starred  The Bloodhound, a mystery film inspired by the Edgar Allan Poe short story "The Fall of the House of Usher."

In 2021, he portrayed an electronic musician who suffering a series of nightmares with bizarre and mysterious appearances in Bashira, directed by Nickson Fong. He also played J.R. in Montauk, directed by Sean Nalaboff.

Filmography

Film

Television

Stage

Video games

Awards and nominations

References

External links

1990 births
20th-century American male actors
21st-century American male actors
American male child actors
American male film actors
American male stage actors
American male television actors
American male video game actors
American male voice actors
American people of Irish descent
American people of Scotch-Irish descent
Audiobook narrators
Dwight-Englewood School alumni
Living people
Male actors from New Jersey
Male actors from New York City
Tisch School of the Arts alumni